Giulio Calì (26 March 1895 – 20 January 1967) was an Italian film actor. He appeared in more than 60 films between 1927 and 1966.

Life and career
Born in Rome, Calì started his career on stage, being mainly active in Roman dialect theater and in avanspettacolo. He made his film debut in 1927, in Umberto Paradisi's Un balilla del '48, but his career ultimately started after the Second World War, when he was cast in a good number of films of different genres and quality, even if usually playing very minor roles. Calì is probably best known for his association with director Alberto Lattuada, who gave him his first significant roles, namely Smarazzacucco in The Mill on the Po (1949) and the sailor in The Overcoat (1952). Other notable directors with whom Calì worked include  Steno, Mario Monicelli, Alessandro Blasetti, Mario Mattoli, Luigi Zampa and Luigi Comencini.

Selected filmography

 Before the Postman (1942)
 The Peddler and the Lady (1943)
 The Gates of Heaven (1945)
 The White Primrose (1947)
 Variety Lights (1950)
 Figaro Here, Figaro There (1950)
 Cops and Robbers (1951)
 Toto and the King of Rome (1951)
 The Overcoat (1952)
 At the Edge of the City (1953)  
 My Life Is Yours (1953)
 Il viale della speranza (1953)
 I Chose Love (1953)
 Musoduro (1953)
 Le infedeli (1953)
 Days of Love (1954)
 Tears of Love (1954)
 Tragic Ballad (1954)
 Too Bad She's Bad (1954)
 A Day in Court (1954)
 Public Opinion (1954)
 A Hero of Our Times (1955)
 The Mysteries of Paris (1957)
 The Defeated Victor (1958)

References

External links

1895 births
1967 deaths
Italian male film actors
Male actors from Rome
20th-century Italian male actors